"Whatever Comes First" is the debut song written by Drew Womack, Walt Aldridge and Brad Crisler, and recorded by American country music group Sons of the Desert.  It was released in February 1997 as the first single and title track from the album Whatever Comes First.  The song reached #10 on the Billboard Hot Country Singles & Tracks chart.

Music video
The music video was directed by Roger Pistole and premiered in March 1997.

Chart performance
"Whatever Comes First" debuted at number 54 on the U.S. Billboard Hot Country Singles & Tracks for the week of March 8, 1997.

Year-end charts

References

1997 debut singles
1997 songs
Sons of the Desert (band) songs
Songs written by Brad Crisler
Songs written by Walt Aldridge
Song recordings produced by Doug Johnson (record producer)
Epic Records singles